Renato De Manzano (March 19, 1907 in Trieste, Austria-Hungary, now Italy - September 25, 1968 in Trieste) was an Italian professional football player.

1907 births
Year of death missing
Italian footballers
Serie A players
U.S. Triestina Calcio 1918 players
Spezia Calcio players
Inter Milan players
Palermo F.C. players
A.C. Milan players
U.S. Cremonese players
Association football midfielders
A.S.D. Fanfulla players